The 2007 Scarborough Borough Council elections to the Scarborough Borough Council were held on 3 May 2007.  The whole council was up for election and the Conservative party lost overall control of the council to no overall control.  Overall turnout was 36%.

Election result

|}

3 Conservative candidates were uncontested.

Ward results

External links
2007 Scarborough election result

2007
2007 English local elections
2000s in North Yorkshire